Gymnopilus njalaensis is a species of mushroom in the family Hymenogastraceae.

See also

List of Gymnopilus species

External links
Gymnopilus njalaensis at Index Fungorum

njalaensis
Fungi of North America